La Clé sur la porte (meaning "The Key is in the door") is a novel written by Marie Cardinal and published in 1972. It is the story of a woman trying to reexamine her own values and free herself from social restraints after suffering a lifetime of oppression. The novel describes her self-therapy; a kind of experiment, allowing her children the freedom she never had in her own strict upbringing, and her ‘interviews’ with their friends.

Plot summary

A forty-year-old woman describes her life living in an apartment in Paris with her three children and their friends. As a community experiment based on total freedom the key lives permanently over the door and everyone comes and goes as they please. She contrasts her formerly strict and closed world against the free one of today; obedience to values against wavering anarchy; alacrity and faineance; hard loneliness versus warm fraternity. Marie Cardinal invites us to question these themes in this personal and passionate book, rich in humour and emotion. La Clé sur la porte is a serious and picturesque novel of today's youth, written by an elder who knew how to commingle.

Adaptation
A movie with the same title was adapted in 1977 by Writer/Director André Weinfeld from the novel. It starred Annie Girardot and Patrick Dewaere and was directed by Yves Boisset.

References
Marie Cardinal, La Clé sur la porte (Paris: Livre de Poche, 1972)

1972 French novels
Feminist novels
Novels set in Paris
French novels adapted into films